James Harold McCusker (7 February 1940 – 12 February 1990) was a Northern Ireland Ulster Unionist Party politician who served as the Deputy Leader of the UUP Assembly Group from 1982 to 1986.

Early life
The younger son of Jim and Lily McCusker (he had one older brother), he was born and raised in the heart of Lurgan. Educated at Lurgan Model Primary School, Lurgan College and Stranmillis University College, before qualifying as a teacher. Before entering politics he worked in industry, latterly with Goodyear, in their Craigavon Plant.

Political career
He represented the Armagh constituency, and was first returned to the British House of Commons at the February 1974 general election. He was returned again in October 1974 and in the 1979 election. In 1982 he topped the poll in Armagh in the Assembly election.

At the 1983 general election, McCusker was returned for the new seat of Upper Bann.  Alongside other Unionist MPs, he resigned his seat in protest at the Anglo-Irish Agreement in 1985, in order to contest his seat again at the ensuing by-election.  He was returned again at the 1987 general election, which was to prove his last — he died of cancer in 1990, causing another by-election, which was won by future Ulster Unionist leader David Trimble.

Personal life

McCusker was an Orangeman and staunch Unionist. He was married, with 3 sons, Moore, James and Colin. His youngest son, Colin (who was 18 at the time of his father's death), ran for the Northern Ireland Assembly in 2011 polling 3,402 1st preference votes, but failed to get elected. He served on Craigavon Council from February 2012 – March 2015 (also Ulster Unionist) and was elected the last Mayor of Craigavon in June 2014. Colin was elected to the new Armagh City, Banbridge & Craogavon Borough Council under RPA in May 2014.

Prior to his death from cancer in 1990, five days after his 50th birthday, McCusker was expected to rise further in the Ulster Unionist Party and British political scenes, due to his ability and popularity among his peers and the wider public. He was a member of the Methodist Church of Ireland (Lurgan circuit).

References

External links 
 

1940 births
1990 deaths
Deaths from cancer in Northern Ireland
Members of the Parliament of the United Kingdom for County Armagh constituencies (since 1922)
Members of the Parliament of the United Kingdom for Upper Bann
Northern Ireland MPAs 1982–1986
Ulster Unionist Party members of the House of Commons of the United Kingdom
UK MPs 1974
UK MPs 1974–1979
UK MPs 1979–1983
UK MPs 1983–1987
UK MPs 1987–1992
People from Portadown
People educated at Lurgan College
Alumni of Stranmillis University College